The iQFoil World Championships is an international sailing competition organized by the International Sailing Federation, held since 2021.

Seniors

Men

Women

Under 21

Men

Women

References

 
Recurring sporting events established in 2021